Sadık Savaş (born August 16, 1987) is a Turkish Paralympian archer competing in the Men's recurve bow event.

Early life
Sadık Savaş was born on August 16, 1987. He lives in Ankara, Turkey.

Sporting career
Savaş began his archery career in 2010, and debuted internationally in 2013. He has been coached by Oğuzhan Polat since 2012.

He obtained a quota for the 2016 Summer Paralympics Games in Rio de Janeiro, Brazil.

In 2021, he won the silver medal in the Mixed team event together with his team mate Merve Nur Eroğlu at the 7th Fazza Para Archery World Ranking Tournament held in Dubai, United Arab Emirates.

References

1987 births
Sportspeople from Yozgat
Turkish male archers
Paralympic archers of Turkey
Wheelchair category Paralympic competitors
Archers at the 2016 Summer Paralympics
Living people
Archers at the 2020 Summer Paralympics
Islamic Solidarity Games medalists in archery
21st-century Turkish people